Alfredo A. Cabrera (May 11, 18811964) was a professional baseball shortstop who played many years in the Cuban League. His nickname was Pájaro, which is Spanish for "Bird."

Cabrera's career is particularly noteworthy because he became the first Spanish-born major leaguer and the first from the continent of Africa when he made his Major League Baseball debut for the St. Louis Cardinals on May 16, 1913. He was hitless in two at-bats and never played in another MLB game.

Cabrera played in the Cuban League from 1901 to 1920 and was elected to the Cuban Baseball Hall of Fame in 1942. He also managed in the Cuban League and won a championship in the winter of 1915/16 as manager of the Almendares team.

Notes

References
.

External links

1881 births
1964 deaths
Spanish emigrants to Cuba
Cuban people of Canarian descent
Sportspeople from the Province of Santa Cruz de Tenerife
Major League Baseball players from Spain
St. Louis Cardinals players
Major League Baseball shortstops
Azul (baseball) players
Nuevo Criollo players
Almendares (baseball) players
All Cubans players
New Britain Perfectos players
Almendares Park players
Club Fé players
Waterbury Spuds players
Springfield Ponies players
Springfield Tips players
Worcester Busters players
People from Tenerife